The Office of High Sheriff of Greater Manchester is the ceremonial position of High Sheriff appointed to Greater Manchester, a metropolitan county in North West England. The appointment is made by the British monarch, in their capacity as Duke of Lancaster, by pricking the Lites. Created in 1974, the High Sheriff of Greater Manchester has the duty to "protect and assist in upholding the dignity and well being of His Majesty's judges and to represent the Queens executive powers in respect of the administration of justice in the county".

The Office of High Sheriff is normally awarded to people of stature in Greater Manchester who have significantly and positively contributed in some way to the county's community either through voluntary work or through commerce or industry. The High Sheriff of Greater Manchester holds the post for one year and automatically becomes an ex officio trustee of the Greater Manchester High Sheriff's Police Trust during their year of office.

In addition to the role of "Keeper of The King's Peace in the County", foremost duties include looking after the High Court judges when they are sitting in the Manchester Crown Court. However, much of the administration being undertaken by an undersheriff. The post is granted in a ceremony at one of Greater Manchester's Town halls or other prominent venues in April each year.

List of sheriffs
Each High Sheriff begins their year in office on 1 April.

See also
Greater Manchester Police
Lord Lieutenant of Greater Manchester

References

External links
www.gmhspolice-trust.co.uk, The Greater Manchester High Sheriff's Police Trust.
www.highsheriffs.com, The Association of High Sheriffs.

 
Greater Manchester
Local government in Greater Manchester
High Sheriffs